Chaetomorpha antennina is a species of green algae of the family Cladophoraceae.

References 

Cladophoraceae
Plants described in 1847
Taxa named by Friedrich Traugott Kützing